Bupleurum dianthifolium is a species of flowering plant in the family Apiaceae. It is endemic to Italy. Its natural habitat is Mediterranean-type shrubby vegetation. It is threatened by habitat loss.

References

dianthifolium
Flora of Italy
Critically endangered plants
Taxonomy articles created by Polbot